The 2017 Carolina Challenge Cup was the 13th edition of the Carolina Challenge Cup, an annual soccer tournament held in South Carolina by the Charleston Battery. The tournament ran from February 18 to 25, with all matches played at MUSC Health Stadium in Charleston, South Carolina.

In addition to the Charleston Battery of the United Soccer League (USL), three Major League Soccer (MLS) clubs participated: expansion franchise Atlanta United FC, Columbus Crew SC and defending MLS Cup champions Seattle Sounders FC. Columbus won the competition with two wins and one draw.

Teams

Standings

Matches

See also 
 Carolina Challenge Cup
 Charleston Battery
 2017 in American soccer

References 

2017
2017 in American soccer
2017 in sports in South Carolina
February 2017 sports events in the United States